The Oxford University Women's Basketball team is the college basketball team at University of Oxford in England. The Blues won their first B.U.S.A. national championship in 1994 and then back to back B.U.S.A. National Championships in 1998 and 1999.

Notable alumni 
Jodi Evans - Canadian Women's National Team Basketball Player

Robyn Hadley - First African American woman from the Southern United States to be named a Rhodes Scholar

Susan Rice - Director of the United States Domestic Policy Council

Monde Muyangwa - Africa Program Director at the Woodrow Wilson International Center for Scholars

References

External links 
 Official Website

Basketball teams in England
Basketball